"Heart Full of Love" is a song written by Kostas, and recorded by American country music artist Holly Dunn.  It was released in January 1991 as the second single and title track from the album Heart Full of Love.  The song reached #19 on the Billboard Hot Country Singles & Tracks chart.

Chart performance

References

1990 songs
1991 singles
Holly Dunn songs
Songs written by Kostas (songwriter)
Warner Records singles
Songs written by Chris Waters